Maurice of Carnoet was a Cistercian abbot. Born in Brittany, Maurice went on to study at the University of Paris. When he completed his studies he entered the Langonette Monastery in 1144. In 1176 he was elected abbot of Langonette Monastery. Later Duke Conan IV of Brittany build the Carnoet Abbey, for Maurice. In 1176 he became the monastery's first abbot.

References

French Roman Catholic saints
12th-century Christian saints
1191 deaths
1117 births
French Cistercians
12th-century French Roman Catholic priests
University of Paris alumni